Turridrupa deceptrix is a species of sea snail, a marine gastropod mollusk in the family Turridae, the turrids.

Description
The length of the shell attains 22.5 mm, its diameter 17.9 mm.

(Original description) The very solid shell has an elongate-conic shape. It is contracted at the base, constricted and channelled at the suture. The body whorl measures about half the total length. The shell contains eleven whorls, including the protoconch0 Its colour is pale ochraceons-buff, the aperture lighter. 

Sculpture: The body whorl contains thirteen, penultimate with four, and earlier whorls with three prominent spiral keels.  The furrows between carry faint radial striae, and sometimes a small interstitial thread. 

Aperture: there is a thin callus sheet on the inner lip, and a solid callus plug at the angle of the aperture. The outer lip is simple. The sinus has a semicircular notch with reflected margin. The siphonal canal is short, open, and slightly recurved. Deep within the throat are five revolving raised threads.

Distribution
This marine species occurs in the South China Sea; off Japan, Indonesia, West New Guinea, Australia and the Andaman Islands.

References

 Powell, A.W.B. 1966. The molluscan families Speightiidae and Turridae, an evaluation of the valid taxa, both Recent and fossil, with list of characteristic species. Bulletin of the Auckland Institute and Museum. Auckland, New Zealand 5: 1–184, pls 1–23
 Powell, A.W.B. 1967. The family Turridae in the Indo-Pacific. Part 1a. The Turrinae concluded. Indo-Pacific Mollusca 1(7): 409-443, pls 298-317
 Liu J.Y. [Ruiyu] (ed.). (2008). Checklist of marine biota of China seas. China Science Press. 1267 pp
 Li B.Q., Kilburn R.N., & Li X.Z. (2010). Report on Crassispirinae Morrison, (Mollusca: Neogastropoda: Turridae) from the China Seas. Journal of Natural History. 44, 699-740

External links
  Hedley, C. 1922. A revision of the Australian Turridae. Records of the Australian Museum 13(6): 213-359, pls 42-56 
  Tucker, J.K. 2004 Catalog of recent and fossil turrids (Mollusca: Gastropoda). Zootaxa 682:1-1295.
  Baoquan Li 李宝泉 & R.N. Kilburn, Report on Crassispirinae Morrison, 1966 (Mollusca: Neogastropoda: Turridae) from the China Seas; Journal of Natural History 44(11):699–740 · March 2010; DOI: 10.1080/00222930903470086

deceptrix
Gastropods described in 1922